Billboard Top Hits: 1995 is a compilation album released by Rhino Records in 2000, featuring ten hit recordings from 1995.

No songs that reached No. 1 on the Billboard Hot 100 are included in this collection. The highest-charting song from that chart to appear on this album is "Run Away" by Real McCoy, which peaked at No. 3. Each song did peak in the top five of a Billboard chart, such as the dance, adult contemporary and R&B charts.

Track listing

Track information and credits were taken from the CD liner notes.

References

2000 compilation albums
Billboard Top Hits albums